Joseph Chambers (born January 19, 1936) is a Classical Pentecostal and has authored six books, co-authored 2 books, has written over 185 booklets, and made over 18 videos  on various Christian related subjects, including a video series with an exposé on Benny Hinn, Kenneth Hagin, and The False Anointing. He was married to Juanita H. Chambers and has three children and six grandchildren.

Formerly an ordained minister of the Church of God (Cleveland, Tennessee), Chambers served as a pastor in Tabor City, North Carolina between 1957–1958, Rockwell, North Carolina between 1958–1964 and Black Mountain, North Carolina between 1964–1968. Since 1968, he has been senior pastor of Paw Creek Ministries (formerly Paw Creek Church of God)  in Charlotte, North Carolina.

Early life and childhood 
Chambers was illiterate until age 16, at the time of his conversion to Christianity. Prior to this, his alcoholic father committed suicide.

Education 
After receiving General Educational Development (GED), he studied through Montreat-Anderson College and was granted a non academic Doctorate of Divinity Degree<Wikipedia-Doctorate of Divinity> from [[Non-accredited Indiana Christian University]<Wikipedia>], and was granted a Doctorate of Sacred Literature from Bethany Theological Seminary.

Political history 
He served on the National Republican Congressional Committee from 1982–1990, and has been on the Mecklenburg Republican Executive Committee since 1990 to this day.

Church history 
In 1992, Chambers and his church withdrew from the Church of God over a conflict involving doctrinal issues about the Charismatic movement, a departure from the King James Bible and holiness. Subsequently, Paw Creek Ministries was sued by the Church of God in a long court battle, resulting in the seizure of their 20-acre, $3 million complex in northwest Charlotte. The church eventually moved to its own building a few miles away.

He is the Founder & President of Paw Creek Christian Academy (1974–Present), a Radio Host of One Hour Weekly Program, OPEN BIBLE DIALOGUE (1972–Present), the Founder & Chairman of Concerned Charlotteans (1983–Present), and the Co-Founder of Concerned Voice for Child Care (1985–Present).

He is the General Overseer of the Bible Holiness Ministerial Fellowship, which was organized in November 1998, and has ministers in the US and four foreign countries.

He is also member of The Pre Tribulation Research Centre, .

Website & Media Outreach 
Chambers blogs on his website about current sociological issues. Through his email newsletters, he has stated opinions, based on well established Christian beliefs, that frequently differ from mainstream media figures such as Oprah Winfrey.

He reports spending over $100,000 a year on media outreach. He has received numerous prank calls that can be viewed on YouTube.

Published works 
 The challenge of the ministry, Pathway Press (Co-author)
 Miracles, my Fathers delight, Pathway Press (Author)
 Storming Toward Armageddon, New Leaf Press (Co-author)
 A Palace for the Antichrist, New Leaf Press (Author)
 Now! Rediscovering the Biblical Family
 Now! Religious Mega Trends
 Bread from the Master's Table
 ''Feast of Tabernacles'

References 

1936 births
Montreat College alumni
Pentecostalism in North Carolina
Indiana Christian University alumni
American male writers
Living people
Religious leaders from North Carolina